The 2001 Giro di Lombardia was the 95th edition of the Giro di Lombardia cycle race and was held on 20 October 2001. The race started in Varese and finished in Bergamo. The race was won by Danilo Di Luca of the Cantina Tollo team.

General classification

References

2001
2001 in road cycling
2001 in Italian sport
2001 UCI Road World Cup
October 2001 sports events in Europe